Ahô: The Forest People is a 1975 Canadian documentary film, directed by François Floquet and Daniel Bertolino. The film is a portrait of various indigenous peoples around the world who still live in traditional forest or jungle settings rather than westernized towns and cities, including groups from Cameroon, Brazil, Indonesia and Papua New Guinea.

The film won the Canadian Film Award for Best Feature Length Documentary at the 27th Canadian Film Awards in 1976.

References

External links
 

1975 films
1975 documentary films
Canadian documentary films
Best Documentary Film Genie and Canadian Screen Award winners
1970s French-language films
French-language Canadian films
1970s Canadian films